The Borough of Burnley is a local government district with the borough status in Lancashire, England. Other notable settlements include Padiham, Hapton, Worsthorne, Briercliffe and Cliviger.

The borough is bounded by Hyndburn, Ribble Valley, Pendle, Rossendale – all in Lancashire – and the borough of Calderdale in West Yorkshire. It is governed by Burnley Borough Council, which is currently under no overall control following the 2019 local elections.

History
The district was formed on 1 April 1974, when the former county borough of Burnley merged with the urban district of Padiham and part of Burnley Rural District. The council is based at Burnley Town Hall.

1976 saw all of the district's councillors stand for re-election as all the borough's wards were abolished and replaced with 22 new ones with a total of 54 seats. Although the majority of the new wards elected three councillors, six (Briercliffe, Cliviger, Deerplay, Hapton, Simonstone Hill and Worsthorne) only elected a single councillor.

At this time the civil parishes of Simonstone and North Town (historically associated with Padiham) were included in the borough, with the two merging in 1983. However, after a successful public campaign to move Simonstone into the Borough of Ribble Valley and Boundary Commission review completed in 1985, the part of North Town south of the A6068 Padiham Bypass was added to Ightenhill. Another part was transferred to Pendle district's Higham with West Close Booth and small adjustments occurred to the boundaries with Hyndburn's Altham parish along the River Calder near Padiham. Also in 1983 a boundary change transferred a small part of Habergham Eaves into Dunnockshaw.

1991 again saw all of the district's councillors stand for re-election as the borough's wards were again abolished and replaced, this time with 16 new ones each electing three councillors, with a total of 48 seats. Among other changes Cliviger merged with Worsthorne, Coalclough with Deerplay, and Hapton with Park.

Along with much of Burnley, Padiham had initially formed part of an unparished area, a new civil parish was formed in late 2001, covering a similar area to the old urban district. A Town Council was instituted in 2002, holding its meetings at Padiham Town Hall. Also 2002 saw another full council election as the number of wards reduced to 15 with a total of 45 seats.

2004 saw more boundary changes effecting the civil parishes within the borough (all except Habergham Eaves and Dunnockshaw) along with the unparished area.

In 2007 a proposal to merge Burnley with neighbouring Pendle Borough Council to form a larger unitary authority was rejected by the government.

The creation of the Burnley Bondholders scheme, an initiative which brings together local firms to promote Burnley as a place for business saw Burnley awarded an Enterprising Britain award from the UK Government in 2013, for being the 'Most Enterprising Area in the UK'.

Governance

Burnley is a non-metropolitan district forming a lower-tier of local government under Lancashire County Council.

The borough comprises 15 wards electing a total of 45 councillors. Wards: Bank Hall, Briercliffe, Brunshaw, Coal Clough with Deerplay, Daneshouse with Stoneyholme, Gannow, Lanehead, Queensgate, Rosegrove with Lowerhouse, Rosehill with Burnley Wood, Trinity, and Whittlefield with Ightenhill, Cliviger with Worsthorne, Gawthorpe, and Hapton with Park.

Burnley Borough Council has had a predominantly Labour controlled history, the party returned to power in 2012, after a period of leadership by the Liberal Democrats. Following the delayed 2021 local election, Labour formed a coalition executive with the Lib Dems, with Labour's Afrasiab Anwar as council leader.

From 2002, a number of BNP councillors were elected in the borough, with the last councillor losing her seat in the Hapton with Park ward in 2012. UKIP won its first seat on the council, also in Hapton with Park in 2015, collecting all three seats in the ward after 2019 but lost representation when its three councillors joined the Conservative group in 2020. After the 2021 elections the Conservatives have nine councillors and are the second largest group on the council. In 2017 Brexit had also caused the fracture of the local Lib Dems and the formation of the Burnley and Padiham Independent Party. The Green Party won its first seat in Trinity ward in 2018 and as of the 2021 elections has five councillors representing three different wards.

The borough contains the civil parishes of Briercliffe, Cliviger, Dunnockshaw, Habergham Eaves, Hapton, Ightenhill, Padiham, and Worsthorne-with-Hurstwood.

The district is represented on Lancashire County Council in six divisions: Burnley Central East, Burnley Central West, Burnley North East, Burnley South West, Burnley Rural and Padiham & Burnley West.

The boundaries of the Burnley Parliamentary constituency as the same a those of the borough.

Mayor
Burnley has had an office of mayor since 1882. In the modern era the councillors elect from among themselves a new mayor each May. The role is a ceremonial position, described as a non-political symbol of the local authority. The mayor presides over meetings of the full council and has a function of interpreting the council's constitution. During ceremonial occasions the mayor has seniority over everyone within the borough, bar the Queen (who also holds the title of Duke of Lancaster) or her representative, the Lord Lieutenant of Lancashire. The office-holder, along with the mayoress or mayor's consort, are also expected to act as ambassadors for the area and support local community groups and charitable organisations. For 2021-22 the mayor is Mark Townsend (Labour Party) who replaced Wajid Khan (also Labour).

Geography

The Borough of Burnley roughly covers the upper part of the catchment basin of the River Calder, a major tributary of the River Ribble. This includes the catchment of the River Brun, which meets the Calder in Burnley town centre, but not that of Pendle Water. The Calder has its source in the Cliviger gorge which cuts through the Pennines into Yorkshire, very close to that of the West Yorkshire river with the same name. The gorge is located in the south east of the district and separates the South Pennines to the east from the area known as the Forest of Rossendale to the south. After passing through Burnley, the Calder turns around Ighten Hill forming part of the northern boundary and exits the borough at the west once it has flowed through Padiham. The exceptions to this occur along the southern boundary. The River Irwell and its feeder Whitewell Brook both have their sources on Deerplay Moor in Cliviger. Another tributary, Limy Water begins in Dunnockshaw and supplies the Clowbridge Reservoir. All three flow south into Rossendale. Catlow Brook forms part of the northern boundary (from the Coldwell Reservoirs to Walverden Reservoir) before continuing as Walverden Water into Nelson in Pendle. The banks of the Calder on the western boundary lie approximately  AOD, but the hilltops on the eastern side—also the border between Lancashire and West Yorkshire—exceed  in serval places. Hameldon Hill stands in the southwest corner, forming part of the boundary with Hyndburn.

The Burnley Way, a  waymarked circular footpath, visits much of the district, also passing briefly into the Calderdale district of West Yorkshire. It is considered to start/end at the Weavers' Triangle Visitor Centre at Burnley Wharf on the Leeds and Liverpool Canal.

Media gallery

Demography

The borough's population has fallen from a high of 130,339 in 1911 to an estimated 87,700 in 2005. Between 1991 and 2001, it fell by 2.6%. Its employment rate of 59.0% places it 261st out of 376 local authorities in England & Wales; just 12.6% of its workforce are graduates, placing it 325th out of 376 local authorities.

The 2001 census recorded the population as 89,542 and the average (mean) age of residents was 37.7 years. The gender makeup of the population was 43,408 male and 46,134 female. 64.3% of residents aged 16 to 74 were classed as economically active, with 0.8% long-term unemployed, but 8.9% classified as long-term sick or disabled. The largest employment sectors were manufacturing 29.3%, wholesale and retail trade including motor vehicle repairs 18.2%, and health and social work 12.9%. The ethnic makeup of the district was 91.8% white and 7.2% Asian, with the other ethnic minorities and people of mixed heritage making up the remaining 1%.

A 2010 report commissioned by the BBC and compiled by Experian ranked the borough as having the second lowest property prices in England, this combined with GCSE results and crime rates, led to the borough being ranked as the worst place in England.

The average age of residents had increased to 39.4 years. The population density then . The gender makeup of the population was 42,794 male and 44,265 female. 66.1% of residents aged 16 to 74 were classed as economically active, with 2.1% long-term unemployed and 7% long-term sick or disabled. The largest employment sectors continued to be manufacturing 17.9%, wholesale and retail trade including motor vehicle repairs 16.7%, and health and social work 15.7%. The ethnic makeup of the district had shifted slightly to 87.4% white and 11% Asian, with other ethnic minorities and mixed-heritage people at 1.6%.

Economy

There are several industrial estates and business parks within the borough of varying ages and sizes. The largest are:

Burnley Bridge Business Park
A new  development in Hapton parish, to the south of Padiham. It is connected to Junction 9 of the M65 motorway via a bridge over the Leeds and Liverpool Canal.
Network 65 Business Park
Also located in Hapton on the western side of Burnley, on the south side of M65 Junction 9. Owned by Burnley Council, occupiers include GlenDimplex.
Rossendale Road Industrial Estate
Located in Habergham Eaves on the western side of Burnley, occupiers include The Original Factory Shop, Warburtons and VEKA. The AMS Technology Park has been developed here, focused on advanced technology manufacturers, principally AMS Neve. 
Heasandford Industrial Estate
Situated on the eastern side of Burnley crossing into Briercliffe, occupiers include boohoo.com and Safran Aircelle. It has seen recent expansion with the Innovation Drive development.
Shuttleworth Mead Business Park
Located west of Padiham, on the former Padiham Power Station site (closed 1993). Occupiers include Graham and Brown and Whatmore UK.

There are also a number of smaller sites throughout historically industrial parts of Burnley. Burnham Gate Trading Estate was the site of Duckett's earthen sanitary ware works. Smallshaw & Chestnut Business Park was built over part of the railway sidings connected with Rose Grove railway station. Elm Street and Gannow Business Parks along with Healeywood Industrial Estate all incorporate converted Victorian cotton mill buildings. Empire Business Park, located between Rosegrove and Lowerhouse also opened in 2008.

Public services

Education

Education Services in the borough are provided and controlled by Lancashire County Council.

Fire and rescue
Fire and rescue services in the borough are provided by Lancashire Fire and Rescue Service and controlled by Lancashire County Council.

Health
Health services in the borough are provided by East Lancashire Primary Care Trust and East Lancashire Hospitals NHS Trust, with additional services provided by the North West Ambulance Service and North West Air Ambulance.

The Hospital Trust operates Burnley General Hospital, while the PCT operates the network of GP surgeries, and recently opened 2 Primary Health Care Centres in the borough (St. Peters Centre in 2006 and Briercliffe in 2007).

Housing and construction
In 2000 Burnley Council transferred its stock of around 5300 council houses to Burnley & Padiham Community Housing. Re-branded as Calico Homes in 2004, a nod to the cotton fabric historically so important to the area's economic success, the housing association has since grown and diversified into construction, support and training. The council is still able nominate tenants, prioritised by need, to Calico and the other associations that provide accommodation in the borough. All have agreements stipulating that they will allocate approximately half of their vacancies to council nominees.

Burnley Council's development control team deals with planning permission applications within the borough, subject to appeal to the Government Planning Inspectorate. The council adopted a new planning framework in July 2018, which sets out the overall development strategy for the district up to 2032.

Museums and libraries
The museum at Towneley Hall is owned, funded and managed by the borough council. Queen Street Mill Textile Museum is owned and operated by Lancashire County Council. Since cost-cutting measures saw a temporary closure of the site, a transfer to another operator, possibly the National Trust, is reportedly being investigated. Gawthorpe Hall on the edge of Padiham is owned by the National Trust but managed by the county council.

The county council is also responsible for library provision in the district. As well as the Central Library in Burnley there are smaller sites at Padiham Town Hall, Burnley Campus in Daneshouse, on Coal Clough Lane, and Pike Hill. The mobile library service also serves the area.

Parks and green public spaces

The borough council owns and manages six Green Flag Award parks: Ightenhill Park, Padiham Memorial Park, Queens Park, Scott Park, Thompson Park, and Towneley Park.

Policing
Policing Services in the borough are provided by the Pennine division of Lancashire Constabulary based at Burnley Police station, and controlled by Lancashire County Council. Plans are in place to merge the pennine division into the neighbouring eastern division, based in Blackburn.
Policing Services of the borough's Railways are provided by Pennine division of the British Transport Police – the nearest Transport Police office being in Preston.

Sports and leisure

From 2014, management of the majority of the borough's leisure facilities has been transferred from Burnley Council's sport and culture services department to the Burnley Leisure trust, a registered charity. Overseen by a board of trustees made up of local community members, the trust works in partnership with the council to deliver cultural services, leisure facilities, sport and play development, and promotion of healthy lifestyles.

As of 2021, the trust operates the following sites:
Barden Athletics Track – 400m synthetic running track and grass pitches.
The Boathouse, Thompson Park – Cafe with boat hire.
Burnley Mechanics Theatre
Padiham Leisure Centre – Swimming, gym, sauna, cycling studio, tennis.
Prairie Sports Village – Golf driving range, floodlit 3G football pitches.
St Peter's Leisure Centre – Swimming, gym, squash, multi-sports halls, cycling and dance studios, and a spa.
Towneley Golf – Full 18 hole golf course and separate nine hole course, 18 hole pitch and putt, and a footgolf course.

Also the council's green spaces team still manage sports pitches and courts at: Briercliffe Recreation Ground (football), Ightenhill Park (tennis), Padiham Fennyfold Playing Fields (football), Hapton Recreation Ground (football), Prairie Playing Fields (football, rugby), Scott Park (tennis), Sycamore Avenue (juniors football), Towneley Park (football, tennis), Queens Park (football, tennis).

Waste and recycling
Refuse and Recycling Collections, and Street Cleansing services are the responsibly of the borough council, and these services are currently contracted to Urbaser Ltd.

The borough Council has signed up to Lancashire's Municipal Waste Management Strategy, which specifies that the borough must recycle or compost 56% of all waste by 2015 and 61% by 2020.

There are currently 2 household waste recycling centres run by Lancashire County Council in the borough.  One located on Grosvenor Street in Burnley and the second on Park Road in Padiham.  Lancashire County Councils long-term plans to replace the Burnley site with facility at Heasandford Industrial Estate on the north eastern edge of the town, where approved in 2010 despite local objections regarding the site's suitability. 3 months later they then announced the closure of the Padiham site as part of cost-cutting measures, increasing the unsuitability of the new Burnley site's location.

Freedom of the Borough

The following people and military units have received the Freedom of the Borough of Burnley.

Individuals
 James McIlroy : December 2008.
 James Anderson : 8 December 2011.
 Mark Crabtree: 22 October 2021.

Military Units
 HMS Active, RN: 1989.

Neighbouring districts

See also

Listed buildings in Burnley

References

External links
burnley.co.uk
Burnley Council
Burnley Leisure & Culture
Calico Homes
Lancashire County Council

 
Local government in Burnley
Non-metropolitan districts of Lancashire
1974 establishments in England
Boroughs in England